HMNZS Achilles was a  light cruiser, the second of five in the class. She served in the Royal New Zealand Navy in the Second World War. She was launched in 1931 for the Royal Navy, loaned to New Zealand in 1936 and transferred to the new Royal New Zealand Navy in 1941.

After Second World War service in the Atlantic and Pacific, she was returned to the Royal Navy. She was sold to the Indian Navy in 1948 and recommissioned as INS Delhi. She was scrapped in 1978.

Design
Upgraded to Improved Leander-class, she could carry an aircraft and was the first ship to carry a Supermarine Walrus, although both Walruses were lost before the Second World War began. At one time she carried the unusual DH.82 Queen Bee which was a radio-controlled unmanned aircraft, normally used as a drone.

Service
Achilles was originally built for the Royal Navy, and was commissioned as HMS Achilles on 10 October 1933. She would serve with the Royal Navy's New Zealand Division from 31 March 1937 up to the creation of the Royal New Zealand Navy, into which she was transferred in September 1941 and recommissioned HMNZS Achilles. About 60 per cent of her crew was from New Zealand.

At the outbreak of the Second World War, Achilles began patrolling the west coast of South America looking for German merchant ships, but by 22 October 1939 she had arrived at the Falkland Islands, where she was assigned to the South American Division under Commodore Henry Harwood and allocated to Force G (with Exeter and ).

Battle of the River Plate

In the early morning of 13 December 1939, a force consisting of Achilles, Ajax and Exeter detected smoke on the horizon, which was confirmed at 06:16 to be a pocket battleship, thought to be the  but which turned out to be . Achilles suffered some damage. In the exchange of fire, four crew were killed, her captain, WE Parry, was wounded; 36 of Graf Spees crew were killed.

Graf Spee was forced by international law to leave within 72 hours. Faced with what he believed to be overwhelming odds, the captain of Graf Spee, Hans Langsdorff, scuttled his ship rather than risk the lives of his crew. An ensign flag flown by HMS Achilles in the Battle of the River Plate was donated to Christ Church Cathedral in the Falkland Islands and is still on display hanging on the south wall of the Cathedral at Port Stanley.

Pacific theatre
Following the Atlantic battle, Achilles returned to Auckland, New Zealand, on 23 February 1940, where she underwent a refit until June. After Japan entered the war, she escorted troop convoys, then joined the ANZAC Squadron in the south-west Pacific.

While operating off Guadalcanal Island with US Navy Task Force 67 on 5 January 1943, she was attacked by four Japanese aircraft. A bomb blew the top off X turret, killing 13 sailors. Between April 1943 and May 1944 Achilles was docked in Portsmouth, England for repairs and modernisation. Her single 4-inch AA guns were replaced by the dual-purpose QF 4 inch Mk XVI naval gun in four twin mountings, modern radar was fitted, and the damaged X turret was replaced by four QF 2 pom poms in a quadruple-mount. The work was delayed by a dockyard explosion that killed 14 men. Stoker William Dale was awarded the Albert Medal for Lifesaving for his actions in saving the lives of several dockyard workers.

Sent back to the New Zealand Fleet, Achilles next joined the British Pacific Fleet in May 1945 for final operations in the Pacific War.

Indian Navy

After the war, Achilles was returned to the Royal Navy at Sheerness in Kent, England on 17 September 1946. She remained in service until decommissioned for scrap in Bombay on 30 June 1978. In 1968 she was present at the granting of independence to Mauritius representing the Indian Government together with the Royal Navy frigate  under Captain Cameron Rusby. As part of the scrapping her Y turret was removed and presented as a gift to the New Zealand government. It is now on display at the entrance of Devonport Naval Base in Auckland. On 22 January 1979, Admiral Jal Cursetji, the Indian Navy Chief of the Naval Staff, presented Achilles's builder's plaque, steering wheel and engine room telegraph to Admiral Terence Lewin, the First Sea Lord and Chief of the Naval Staff of the Royal Navy.

Achilles played herself in the film The Battle of the River Plate in 1956.

Notes

References

External links

Royal New Zealand Navy article 

 

1932 ships
Leander-class cruisers (1931) of the Royal Navy
Ships built on the River Mersey
Steamships of the United Kingdom
World War II cruisers of the United Kingdom
Battle of the River Plate
Steamships of New Zealand
Leander-class cruisers (1931) of the Royal New Zealand Navy
World War II cruisers of New Zealand